Diocese of Aragatsotn ( Aragatsotni t'em), is a diocese of the Armenian Apostolic Church covering the Aragatsotn Province of Armenia. The name is derived from the historic Aragatsotn canton of Ayrarat province of  Kingdom of Armenia. 

The diocese was officially founded on May 30, 1996, by Catholicos Karekin I. The diocesan headquarters are located in the provincial capital Ashtarak, while the cathedral of the diocese is the Saint Mesrop Mashtots Church in the nearby village of Oshakan. Bishop Mkrtich Broshyan is currently the primate of the diocese, serving since 2009.

History

Historically, the territory of modern-day Aragatsotn has been regulated by the Araratian Pontifical Diocese and the Diocese of Shirak. The towns of Ashtarak and Aparan along with their villages were under the jurisdiction of the Araratian diocese, while the town of Talin and the surrounding areas were under the jurisdiction of Shirak diocese.

After the independence from the Soviet Union, Armenia has been divided into provinces based on the territorial administration reform of 1995. During the following year, the Diocese of Aragatsotn was officially founded upon a kontakion issued by Catholicos Karekin I on May 30, 1996. The Saint Mesrop Mashtots Church in Oshakan has served as the seat of the diocese since the formation of the diocese.

Currently, the Aragatsotn diocese has 29 churches and 9 chapels under its jurisdiction.

Primates
Bishop Navasard Kchoyan 1996-1999
Bishop Vazgen Mirzakhanyan 1999-2002
Bishop Bagrat Galstanyan 2002-2003
Archimendrite Torgom Tonikyan 2003-2007
Archimendrite Grigor Khachatryan 2007-2009
Bishop Mkrtich Proshyan 2009-present

Active churches
Here is the list of churches, monasteries and chapels functioning under the jurisdiction of the Diocese of Aragatsotn, along with their location and year of consecration:

Churches

Kasagh Basilica of the Holy Cross, Aparan, 4th-5th centuries
Church of Saint John, Mastara, 5th century
Karmravor Church, Ashtarak, 7th century
Saint Stephen Church, Kosh, 7th century
Surp Hovhannes Church, Byurakan, 10th 
Church of the Holy Mother of God, Otevan, 11th century
Church of the Holy Mother of God, Ashnak, 11th century, rebuilt in 2013
Saint Marianeh Church, Ashtarak, 1271
Saint Gregory Church, Parpi, 13th century
Saint Sarkis Church, Ashtarak, 17th century
Surp Astvatsatsin Church, Karbi, 1693
Saint Mesrop Mashtots Church, Oshakan, 1879
Surp Hovhannes Church, Melikgyugh, 1891
Church of the Holy Mother of God, Aparan, 19th century
Saint George's Church, Talin, 19th century
Saint Gregory Church, Kosh, 19th century
Akunk Church, Akunk, 19th century
Church of the Holy Mother of God, Kuchak, 1900
Church of the Holy Mother of God, Nor Yedesia, 1999
Surp Stepanos Church, Chknagh, 2004
Church of Saint Gregory of Narek, Ghazaravan, completed in 2005 but not yet consecrated 
Surp Nshan Church, Berkarat, 2011

Monasteries
Hovhannavank Monastery, Ohanavan, 1216
Saghmosavank Monastery, Saghmosavan, 1221
Tegher Monastery near Tegher, 13th century
Saint Gevork Monastery, Mughni, 14th century

Chapels
Tukh Manuk Shrine, Oshakan, 12-13th centuries
Tukh Manuk Chapel, Mastara, 13th century
Saint Gregory Chapel, Oshakan, 13th century
Saint Thaddeus Chapel, Oshakan, 13th century
Kiraknamut Chapel, Antarut, 13th century
Saint Gregory Chapel, Mastara, 17th century
Surp Narek Chapel, Chknagh, 1830s, rebuilt in 2003
Chapel of Virgin Sandukht, Talin, 19th century
Surp Minas Chapel, Mastara, 19th century
Chapel of Saints Mary and Elisabeth, Arayi, 2002
Holy Mother of God Chapel, Yernjatap, 2007
Holy Mother of God Chapel, Agarak, 2008
Holy Trinity Altar of Hope, Aparan, 2012

Inactive/ruined churches and monasteries
This is an incomplete list of inactive or ruined churches and monasteries in the territory regulated by the Diocese of Aragatsotn:

Saints Paul and Peter Church, Zovuni near Jrambar, 4th-5th centuries
Astvatsenkal Monastery near Hartavan, 4th-5th centuries,
Lusagyugh Red Monastery, Lusagyugh, 5th century
Surp Stepanos Church, Chknagh, 5th century
Holy Saviour's Church of Shenik, Mastara, 5th century
Tsiranavor Church, Ashtarak, 5th century
Tsiranavor Church, Parpi, 5th century
Arshakuni Church of Aghdzk, Aghdzk, 5th century
Holy Mother of God Church of Shenik, Mastara, 6th century
Aruchavank Monastery, Aruch, 660s
Cathedral of Talin, Talin, 7th century
Saint George's Church, Garnahovit, 7th century
Targmanchats Church, Parpi, 7th century
Church of Kamsarakan Surp Astvatsatsin, Talin, 7th century
Saint Christopher Monastery, Dashtadem, 7th century
Artavazik Church, Byurakan, 7th century
Surp Hovhannes Church, Voskevaz, 7th century
Saint Sarkis Monastery, Ushi, 7th century
Tukh Manuk Chapel, Lusagyugh, 7th century
Saint Zion Church, Oshakan, 7th century
Surp Astvatsatsin Basilica, Verin Sasunik, 7th century
Yeghipatrush Church of the Holy Mother of God, Yeghipatrush, 10th century
Vahramashen Church of the Holy Mother of God, Byurakan, 1026
Tukh Manuk Chapel, Kuchak, 12-13th centuries
Holy Mother of God Church, Yernjatap, 12th-13the centuries
Spitakavor Church, Ashtarak, 13th century
Surp Stepanos Nakhavka Church, Mastara, 17th century
Berkarat Church, Berkarat, 19th century
Holy Mother of God Church, Antarut, 19th century
Saint George's Church, Kosh, 19th century
Saint George's Church, Kuchak, 1891

References
 

Aragatsotn
Christianity in Armenia
Aragatsotn Province
Oriental Orthodox dioceses in Armenia